The Artashi Formation, also rendered A’ertashi, is located in the village of A’ertashi in Shache County, Xinjiang Uygur Autonomous Region. It is dated to the Paleocene period.

References

Geology of Xinjiang
Geologic formations of China